Hampton–Dumont Community School District is a rural public school district headquartered in Hampton, Iowa.

It is in Franklin and Butler counties, serving Hampton, Dumont, Hansell, and Aredale.

, the district had 1,275 students.

History
It was established on July 1, 1995, by the merger of the Dumont and Hampton school districts. The two districts had established a grade sharing agreement in 1989.

The district was scheduled to begin sharing a superintendent with the CAL Community School District in 2016. The school board of Hampton–Dumont CSD approved the arrangement, effective July 1 that year. In 2018, the Hampton district entered into a whole grade-sharing agreement with CAL, with the latter sending its secondary students to Hampton–Dumont.

List of schools
North Side Elementary
South Side Elementary
Hampton–Dumont Middle School
Hampton–Dumont High School

Hampton–Dumont High School

Athletics 
The Bulldogs compete in the North Central Conference in the following sports:

Cross country
Volleyball
Football
2007 Class 2A state champions
Basketball
Girls' 2-time state champions (1926, 1933)
Swimming
Wrestling
Track and field
Golf
 2007 boy's Class 2A state champions
 2007 coed Class 1A state champions
 2008 girls' Class 2A state champions
Soccer
Baseball
Softball

See also
List of school districts in Iowa
List of high schools in Iowa

References

External links
 Hampton–Dumont Community School District
 

School districts in Iowa
Education in Butler County, Iowa
Education in Franklin County, Iowa
1995 establishments in Iowa
School districts established in 1995